Nancy S. Kim (born 1966) is a Korean American novelist.

Born in Seoul, South Korea, and raised in Los Angeles, she is a corporate lawyer in San Francisco, a Law Professor in San Diego, and the author of the novel Chinhominey's Secret.

Chinhominey's Secret
Chihominey's Secret is Nancy Kim's first novel. It tells the story of the Choi family, a Korean American family in West L.A. living with a haunting prophecy from 20+ years ago. Through the family, the novel examines the generational conflict between immigrant parents and their assimilated, Americanized daughters as their Korean grandfather comes to visit. The book's title is an intentional misspelling of the Korean word for "paternal grandmother", chinhalmeoni (친할머니).

Linda Richards, writing for January Magazine, praised it as "an engaging story, well told".

However, Philip Gambone of The New York Times was more critical, stating that "we're given melodramatic plot twists and scenes that serve no purpose ... and the dialogue often reads like a soap opera".

Chinhominey's Secret was a Booklist Editor's Choice for Best Adult Books for Young Adults for 1999.

Works

References

1966 births 
Living people
American writers of Korean descent
South Korean emigrants to the United States
American women novelists
People from Seoul
Writers from Los Angeles
20th-century American women writers
20th-century American novelists
21st-century American women